Corpa is a municipality of the autonomous community of Madrid in central Spain. It belongs to the comarca of Alcalá.

References

External links

Estadística
 Instituto de Estadística de la Comunidad de Madrid > Ficha municipal 
 Instituto de Estadística de la Comunidad de Madrid > Series estadísticas del municipio
Callejero, cartografía y fotografía aérea
 Instituto de Estadística de la Comunidad de Madrid > Nomenclátor Oficial y Callejero

Municipalities in the Community of Madrid